The Pedro Camejo Municipality is one of the seven municipalities (municipios) that makes up the Venezuelan state of Apure and, according to the 2011 census by the National Institute of Statistics of Venezuela, the municipality has a population of 28,966. The town of San Juan de Payara is the municipal seat of the Pedro Camejo Municipality. The municipality is named after Afro-Venezuelan independence hero Pedro Camejo.

Demographics
The Pedro Camejo Municipality, according to a 2007 population estimate by the National Institute of Statistics of Venezuela, has a population of 31,187 (up from 26,407 in 2000). This amounts to 6.5% of the state's population.

Government
The mayor of the Pedro Camejo Municipality is Pedro Danilo Leal, re-elected November 23, 2008 with 56% of the vote. The municipality is divided into three parishes; Urbana San Juan de Payara, Codazzi, and Cunaviche.

References

External links
pedrocamejo-apure.gob.ve 

Municipalities of Apure